Valtanen is a surname. Notable people with the surname include:

Jaakko Valtanen (born 1925), Finnish general
Juha Valtanen (born 1952), Finnish sailor

See also
Valtonen

Finnish-language surnames